Keith John Rosewarne (18 July 1924 – 27 May 2008) was an Australian rules footballer in the VFL.

Family
The son of Raymond Edgar Rosewarne (1898–1984), and Ruby Beatrice Pearl Rosewarne (1900–1930), née Buckland, Keith John Rosewarne was born at Windsor, Victoria on 18 July 1924.

He married Mary Lorna Casey on 19 March 1949.

Education
He was educated at Elwood Central School; and whilst there, was selected yo represent Victoria in the 1938 Australian Schoolboys' (under 15) Football Carnival, along with a number of other future VFL footballers, including Les Foote, Len McCankie.

Football

St Kilda (VFL)
A local recruit, having played with the St Kilda Thirds before his military service, Rosewarne made his senior debut in 1946, winning the best and fairest award in his first season. He played as a rover and was a regular goalscorer, often kicking multiple goals in a match. 

In 92 games with the club, he scored 150 goals for an otherwise unsuccessful team.

Victoria (VFL)
Rosewarne represented Victoria at the 1947 Hobart Carnival versus South Australia, and Queensland.

Ballarat North
His retirement from the VFL came in 1951 at the age of 27, and in early 1952 he was cleared to Ballarat North club.

Military service
Rosewarne served during World War II in the Australian Army.

See also
 1947 Hobart Carnival

Notes

References 
 Profile at Saints.com.au
 Saints of 1946 article at Saints.com.au
 Keith Rosewarne's obituary
 St. Kilda at Practice, The Herald, (Wednesday, 1 October 1947), p.18.
 World War Two Nominal Roll: Lance Corporal Keith John Rosewarne (VX145595), Department of Veterans' Affairs.
 B883, VX145595: World War Two Service Record: PLance Corporal Keith John Rosewarne (VX145595), National Archives of Australia.

External links
 
 

Trevor Barker Award winners
1924 births
2008 deaths
Australian rules footballers from Melbourne
St Kilda Football Club players
People from Windsor, Victoria